Kenya–Sahrawi Arab Democratic Republic relations are bilateral relations between the Sahrawi Arab Democratic Republic and Kenya.

History
In March 2005  President Kibaki of Kenya received credentials from the ambassador of the Sahrawi Arab Democratic Republic to Kenya. However on October of the same year, the Kenyan government put a temporary freeze on diplomatic relations between both countries.

In February 2014 the Sahrawi Arab Democratic Republic opened an embassy in Nairobi. The ceremony was attended by the Foreign Minister of the SADR, former Vice President of Kenya Kalonzo Musyoka and other members of the diplomatic corps. Mr. Bah Med was accredited as the Extraordinary and Plenipotentiary Ambassador of the Sahrawi Arab Democratic Republic in Kenya. 

Kenya had a diplomatic row with Morocco over the matter.

Diplomatic missions
The Sahrawi Arab Democratic Republic maintains an embassy in Nairobi.

References

Bilateral relations of the Sahrawi Arab Democratic Republic
Sahrawi Arab Democratic Republic